Moorland is a rural locality in the Bundaberg Region, Queensland, Australia. In the  Moorland had a population of 270 people.

Geography 
The locality is bounded to the west by Kolan River, to the north by Booyan Road, to the east in party by Vecellios Road and the North Coast railway line, and to the south by Rosedale Road.

The district once known as North Kolan (or Kolan North) spans Moorland and neighbouring Bucca to the south.

History 
Greenwood Provisional School opened on 15 February 1886.  In 1899 it was renamed Moorland Provisional School. On 1 January 1909 it became Moorland State School. It closed on 31 March 1931, but  reopened on 26 August 1946. On  31 December 1964 it closed, but reopened on 24 January 1966. It closed permanently on 31 October 1975. The school was located on Moorland Road (approx ).

In the  Moorland had a population of 270 people.

References 

Bundaberg Region
Localities in Queensland